The sixth election to Western Isles Council was held on 5 May 1994 as part of the wider 1994 Scottish regional elections. One ward - Laxdale - was unfilled, as no individuals came forward as candidates.

The election saw a political party gain representation in the Council for the first time as the Labour Party won four seats.

Aggregate results

Ward results

References

1994 Scottish local elections
1994